Mohammad Asad (born 19 March 2000) is a Pakistani cricketer. In November 2019, he was named in Pakistan's squad for the 2019 ACC Emerging Teams Asia Cup in Bangladesh. He made his List A debut for Pakistan, against Sri Lanka, in the Emerging Teams Cup on 16 November 2019.

References

External links
 

2000 births
Living people
Pakistani cricketers